Raina Perez (born July 30, 1998) is an American professional basketball player who is a free agent in the Women's National Basketball Association (WNBA). She played college basketball at NC State, Cal State Fullerton, and Northern Arizona.

College career

Northern Arizona
During her freshman season, Perez was one of four players on the team to appear in every game. She averaged 10.1 points, 2.1 rebounds, and 2.3 assists. At the end of the year, Perez was the top scoring freshman in the conference.

Following her freshman season, Perez decided to transfer to Call State Fullerton.

Cal State Fullerton
Perez spent 3 years at Cal State Fullerton. She redshirted during the 2017–2018 season due to NCAA Transfer rules. During the 2018–2019 season, Perez was named to the All-Big West Honorable Mention Team. She tied for the team lead in scoring at 13.0 points, while also adding in 5.0 assists and 1.5 steals.

During her junior season, Perez was a dominant player for the Titans. She increased her averages to 19.8 points, 5.4 rebounds, and 4.2 assists. Her play was recognized by the Big West, as she was named the Big West Player of the Year and to the Big West First Team. She was the first Titan player to win the Player of the Year Award since the 1990–91 season.

After the season, Perez transferred to NC State.

NC State
During her first season as a member of the Wolfpack, Perez was named to the All-ACC Honorable Mention Team. She averaged 9.5 points, 3.4 rebounds, and 4.7 assists, while starting in 23 of the games. She was also a Top 10 Finalist for the Nancy Lieberman Award, which honors the nation's best point guard. She hit the game-winning shot in the ACC Tournament Final to help NC State win their second straight ACC Title.

Perez came back for her COVID-Extra Year and helped guide the Wolfpack to the NCAA Elite Eight. She averaged 8.6 points, 3.1 assists, and 1.1 steals, while starting all 36 games. Perez also once again was clutch in late game situations - this time in the NCAA Tourney. Perez got a steal and layup with 14 seconds left against Notre Dame in the Sweet Sixteen to put NC State up in the last seconds.

College statistics

Professional career

Seattle Storm
Perez went undrafted in the 2022 WNBA Draft, but signed a training camp contract with the Seattle Storm. She was waived on May 2, 2022, during camp. Perez was brought back on May 11, 2022, as a hardship contract with the Storm.

WNBA career statistics

Regular season

|-
| align="left" | 2022
| align="left" | Seattle
| 1 || 0 || 2.0 || .000 || .000 || .000 || 0.0 || 1.0 || 0.0 || 0.0 || 0.0 || 0.0
|-
| align="left" | Career
| align="left" | 1 year, 1 team
| 1 || 0 || 2.0 || .000 || .000 || .000 || 0.0 || 1.0 || 0.0 || 0.0 || 0.0 || 0.0

References

External links
WNBA bio
NC State bio
Cal State Fullerton bio
Northern Arizona bio

1998 births
Living people
American women's basketball players
Basketball players from Arizona
Guards (basketball)
NC State Wolfpack women's basketball players
Cal State Fullerton Titans women's basketball players
Seattle Storm players
Sportspeople from Arizona